Trichordestra lilacina, the aster cutworm, is a species of cutworm or dart moth in the family Noctuidae. It is found in North America.

The MONA or Hodges number for Trichordestra lilacina is 10307.

References

Further reading

 
 
 
 
 
 
 
 
 

Hadenini
Moths described in 1874